The 2016 Volta a la Comunitat Valenciana was a road cycling stage race that took place in the Valencian Community between 3 and 7 February 2016. The race was rated as a 2.1 event as part of the 2016 UCI Europe Tour. It was the 67th edition of the Volta a la Comunitat Valenciana and the first since 2008; the race was revived by Ángel Casero and his brother Rafael.

The race included five stages. The first of these was a  individual time trial; this was then followed by four road stages, ending in Valencia. The previous champion, from the 2008 edition, was Rubén Plaza, but his  team was not among those invited to start the race.

The first stage time trial was won by Wout Poels, with Luis León Sánchez second and Poels's teammate Vasil Kiryienka, the world time trial champion third. Poels retained his lead by finishing third on the uphill finish the following day, with Dan Martin winning the stage. He maintained this the following day, with Dylan Groenewegen ( winning a sprint. Poels extended his lead by winning Stage 4 alone, with his teammate Beñat Intxausti finishing second and moving up to third overall. The final stage was won in a solo break by Stijn Vandenbergh. Poels won the overall classification, with Sánchez second and Intxausti third. Poels also won the points and mountains classification, and Team Sky won the team classification.

Teams 
25 teams were invited to take part in the race. These included eight UCI WorldTeams, eight UCI Professional Continental teams, eight UCI Continental teams and a Spanish national team.

Stages

Stage 1 

3 February 2016 – Benicàssim–Oropesa del Mar,  (ITT)

Stage 2 

4 February Castellón de la Plana–Fredes,

Stage 3 

5 February – Sagunto–Alzira,

Stage 4 

6 February – Orihuela–Xorret de Catí,

Stage 5 

7 February – Valencia–Valencia,

Classification Leadership

References

External links 

 

2016
Volta a la Comunitat Valenciana
Volta a la Comunitat Valenciana